Last Ditch is a detective novel by Ngaio Marsh; it is the twenty-ninth novel to feature Roderick Alleyn, and was first published in 1977.  The plot concerns drug smuggling in the Channel Islands, and features Alleyn's son, Ricky, in a central role.

Roderick Alleyn novels
1977 British novels
Novels set in the Channel Islands
Collins Crime Club books